William Martin Laws Allison (13 January 1908 – 1981) was an English footballer who made 173 appearances in the Football League playing as a left back for Clapton Orient, Darlington and Hartlepools United in the 1930s.

Biography
Bill Allison was born in Shildon, County Durham, on 13 January 1908. He played for Shildon before joining Arsenal for £50 in 1929 where he was on the books for two seasons, playing reserve football without breaking into the first team. He transferred to Clapton Orient in May 1931, making his League debut against Crystal Palace in August 1931 and a total of 14 League appearances before leaving for Darlington in 1932 for whom he played 52 senior games. After a brief spell at Eden Colliery, he joined Hartlepools United in May 1935 where he made 119 senior appearances. He finished his career at Spennymoor United. Allison died in 1981 at Shildon.

Notes

References

1908 births
1981 deaths
People from Shildon
Footballers from County Durham
English footballers
Association football fullbacks
Shildon A.F.C. players
Arsenal F.C. players
Leyton Orient F.C. players
Darlington F.C. players
Eden Colliery Welfare F.C. players
Hartlepool United F.C. players
Walker Celtic F.C. players
Spennymoor United F.C. players
English Football League players
Date of death missing